Velibor is a masculine given name of Slavic origin. It may refer to:

Velibor Đurić (born 1982), Bosnian football player
Velibor Jonić (died 1946), Serbian fascist politician and government minister in World War II
Velibor Kopunović (born 1975), football player
Velibor Milutinović (born 1944), Serbian-Mexican football coach and former player
Velibor Pudar (born 1964), football manager and former goalkeeper
Velibor Radović (born 1972), Montenegrin-Israeli professional basketball player
Velibor Topić (born 1970), actor
Velibor Vasilić (born 1980), Bosnian football player
Velibor Vasović (1939–2002), Serbian football player

Slavic masculine given names
Serbian masculine given names